15 is the debut mixtape by American rapper Bhad Bhabie. It was released on September 18, 2018, by Atlantic Records. It features guest appearances from Lil Baby, Lil Yachty, Asian Doll, YG, City Girls and Ty Dolla Sign.

Background 
Bhad Bhabie was first discovered on the Dr. Phil show, where she said the phrase "cash me outside, how 'bout dah?" This later became a meme which went viral, turning her into an Internet star. She gained a following on Instagram and YouTube, and on August 23, 2017, TMZ leaked what would be her first song to chart on the Billboard Hot 100, "These Heaux". She became the second youngest female artist in music history to enter the Hot 100 with her debut single, debuting and peaking at 77, and a few days later, she was signed to Atlantic Records.

She later released "Hi Bich", which also charted on the Hot 100 at number 68, the highest new entry for that week. It was later certified Platinum by the RIAA. She released more singles over the course of eight months. On March 26, 2018, Bhabie released "Gucci Flip Flops", which reached a peak of 79 on the Hot 100, making her the youngest female to have three songs enter the Hot 100 since LeAnn Rimes. The single went on to be certified Platinum in the US, making it her first single to achieve Platinum status.

On April 14, 2018, she began her international tour Bhanned in the USA with opener Asian Doll, where she previewed many songs like "Affiliated".

After she was nominated at the 2018 Billboard Music Awards for Top Rap Female Artist, she announced she would be releasing a single called "Trust Me" featuring Ty Dolla Sign, as well as a mixtape. She released the single a few weeks later, and while it failed to chart on the Hot 100, it peaked at number nine on the Bubbling Under R&B/Hip-Hop Singles chart. On August 14, 2018, she announced the release date for the mixtape, and released the intro track for the mixtape, "15 Freestyle". A promotional single featuring City Girls, “Yung and Bhad” was released on August 30.

The following month, she released the artwork for the mixtape, and a few days later she revealed the track list, announcing guest appearances from many rappers such as YG and Lil Baby. One day later she previewed the track "Thot Opps (Clout Drop)" on her social media, and the next day she released "Thot Opps (Clout Drop)" and a new track, "Bout That".

She released the music video for her collaboration with Lil Baby, "Geek'd", the mixtape's fourth single, on September 20.

Critical reception 

15 received mixed reviews. Writing for Pitchfork and rating the album a 5.5 out of 10, Michelle Kim stated that "Danielle Bregoli's leap from meme to rapper continues with her debut mixtape that leans heavily on mimicry and trails dreadfully behind the current sound of hip-hop. On 15, her first mixtape as Bhad Bhabie, Bregoli doesn't show much versatility past her well-established tough-girl character. She's successful in imitating the sound of today's rap hits; most of the songs on 15 come across like they're specifically engineered to be placed onto Spotify's 'RapCaviar' playlist."

AllMusic's Neil Yeung rated the mixtape a three out of five, stating that "for what it's worth, buried beneath the posturing and obnoxiousness lies a glimmer of promise. However, Bhad Bhabie requires some polishing and maturity if she's ever going to grow beyond a mere novelty."

For The New York Times, Jon Caramanica gave the album a mixed review and states that "On the entertaining if erratic 15, Bhad Bhabie raps like someone who is learning to rap in real time, which to be fair, she is. Her default mode is taunt, and she's effective at it [...] At its best, 15 is appealing both as straight-ahead hip-hop and also novelty — a rap album made by a rap fan given all the resources of an actual rapper."

Track listing 
Credits adapted from BMI and Tidal.

Credits and personnel
Credits adapted from Tidal.

Production

 Pliznaya – production 
 DJ Chose – production 
 30 Roc – production 
 Cheeze Beatz – production 
 Jo L'Z – production 
 Pharaoh Vice – production 
 Taz Taylor – production 
 The Rascals – production 
 P-Crisco – production 
 Jack Shirak – production 
 Foreign Teck – production 
 Ronny J – production 
 Bobby Kritical – production 
 Price – production 
 Eric Choice – production 
 Win Crabtree – production

Technical
 Thierry Chaunay – engineering

References

2018 mixtape albums
Atlantic Records albums
Bhad Bhabie albums
Albums produced by Cubeatz
Albums produced by Ronny J
Debut mixtape albums